Curda is the name of:

 Piper Curda (born 1997), an American actress and singer
 Karel Čurda (1911 – 1947), a Czech World War II soldier